The 1974–75 Austrian Hockey League season was the 45th season of the Austrian Hockey League, the top level of ice hockey in Austria. Eight teams participated in the league, and ATSE Graz won the championship.

Regular season
{| class="wikitable"
|- bgcolor="#e0e0e0"
! width="30" |
! width="200" | Team
! width="30" | GP
! width="30" | W
! width="30" | L
! width="30" | T
! width="30" | GF
! width="30" | GA
! width="70" | Pts
|- bgcolor="#BCD2EE" align="center"
| 1. || align="left"| ATSE Graz || 28 ||22||4||2||126||48||46
|- bgcolor="#FFFFFF" align="center"
| 2. || align="left"| EC Innsbruck || 28 ||15||10||3||119||107||33''
|- bgcolor="#FFFFFF" align="center"
| 3. || align="left"| EC KAC || 28 ||15||10||3||109||121||33|- bgcolor="#FFFFFF" align="center"
| 4. || align="left"| Wiener EV || 28 ||10||10||8||123||98||28|- bgcolor="#FFFFFF" align="center"
| 5. || align="left"| Kapfenberger SV || 28 ||11||11||6||105||99||28|- bgcolor="#FFFFFF" align="center"
| 6. || align="left"| VEU Feldkirch || 28 ||6||15||7||111||141||19|- bgcolor="#FFFFFF" align="center"
| 7. || align="left"| WAT Stadlau || 28 ||6||15||7||111||152||19|- bgcolor="#FFCCCC" align="center"
| 8. || align="left"| HC Salzburg || 28 ||6||16||6||97||135||18|}

RelegationHC Salzburg''' - EK Zell am See 2:0 (7:2, 9:2)

External links
Austrian Ice Hockey Association

Austrian Hockey League seasons
Aus 
Aust